Tatamailau (Tetum: Foho Tatamailau), or Tata Mailau, sometimes referred as Mount Ramelau, is the highest mountain in East Timor and also of Timor island at . While East Timor was a Portuguese colony it was called the highest mountain of Portugal in the twentieth century, since the highest mountain of Portugal proper is of a more modest height. The name "Tatamailau" is Mambai-origin, the local language and means "Grandfather of all". "Ramelau" is the name of the massif of the mountain. The Tatamailau is dedicated to the Virgin Mary and the subject of an annual pilgrimage commemorating the Annunciation of the Blessed Virgin Mary, on or around 25 March. There is a three-metre-high statue of the Virgin Mary on the peak, which came from Italy and was erected during Indonesian occupation in 1997.

Environment
In the early 1980s the mountain was extensively covered with old growth montane forest and was identified by BirdLife International as an Important Bird Area as it supported several endemic and restricted-range bird species. Since then there has been considerable environmental modification with very little natural tree cover remaining. Deforestation for grazing has left only a few patches of original forest, mainly near mountain crests. The lower slopes are mainly grass covered, with the upper slopes characterised by eucalypt regrowth.

Access
The track from Hato Bulico to the summit is very well formed having originally been cut to create a pilgrimage trail to the Virgin Mary figure on the summit and was once negotiable by four wheel drive vehicle. A map is not required once on the track. The track is now very severely degraded with massive washouts requiring major detours to negotiate. Because the track was cut for vehicular access the constant gradient is monotonous, the poor engineering has caused major environmental damage and the route affords few views of note. The route from Aimeta is via a network of goat herders' tracks, it does not appear on current maps and a local guide is needed. However, the Aimeta track is varied, traverses unspoilt country, is extremely interesting with many unfolding mountain views and consequently presents by far the most enjoyable climb. A fit person should allow four hours from Hato Bulico to the summit, six hours from Aimeta, nine hours from Aimeta to Hato Bulico. Assume no water is available en route. There is no human habitation above Hato Bulico or Aimeta. It is possible to camp on the saddle below the summit in the dry season and experience the sunset and sunrise from the same location. The summit can freeze in the dry season; in the wet season the summit can be sufficiently cold, wet and windy to pose a risk of hypothermia.

Hato Bulico is a 1½ - 2 hour drive from Maubisse on a sealed road but requires a four-wheel drive. In the wet season it can be dangerous and periodically impassable but never for long. There is an excellent resting place at Hato Bulico close to the start of the track.

Aimeta can be reached from Letefoho in about 1½ hours. Shelter, but not food, may be negotiated at Aimeta with local assistance but it is advisable to arrive entirely self-sufficient.  The nearest accommodation is at the Saint Bakhita, Eraulo, via Vila Ermera and an excellent, easy walk is to be had from there to Aimeta in about four hours.  Horses for baggage can be hired at Aimeta and this is useful if camping on the summit or to assist stragglers.  Aimeta can be a logistical challenge, which is why almost all summit bids are launched from Hato Bulico but it is possible, with care, for supporting transport to drive from Aimeta directly to Hato Bulico if the road is navigable otherwise, in the Wet season, via Gleno and Aileu in about five hours.  An ideal route is to do the summit from Aimeta to Hato Bulico taking in both sides of the mountain; local assistance is essential for those without fluent Tetum and local knowledge.

See also
 List of Ultras of Malay Archipelago
 List of elevation extremes by country
 List of Important Bird Areas in East Timor

References

Two-thousanders of East Timor
Hiking in East Timor
Mountains of East Timor
Ainaro Municipality
Ermera Municipality
Important Bird Areas of East Timor
Highest points of countries